Stephan William Burns (November 15, 1954 – February 22, 1990; also credited as Stephan W. Burns, Stephen W. Burns, and Stephan Burns) was an American actor best known for playing Pete Stancheck in Herbie Goes Bananas and Jack Cleary in the miniseries The Thorn Birds.

Early life and career
Burns was born on November 15, 1954 in Elkins Park, Pennsylvania and grew up in the small town of Chews Landing, New Jersey. As soon as he graduated high school, Burns moved to New York City to study theater. He worked odd jobs during the day to pay for his rent and the acting classes he attended at night. Auditions eventually led to an offer for the lead role in the national touring production of the Broadway hit Grease.

Burns moved to Hollywood and within six months, he was offered the role of Li'l Abner in the 1978 TV special Li'l Abner in  Dogpatch Today. During his short career, Burns starred as Pete Stancheck in Walt Disney Productions' Herbie Goes Bananas and appeared on several television shows, as well as starring in the ABC series 240-Robert and The Thorn Birds miniseries. Other credits include Eight Is Enough, Heart of the City and Simon & Simon.

Death
After being involved in a serious car accident in 1984, Burns received an emergency blood transfusion.  Unfortunately, the blood was contaminated, infecting Burns with HIV.  Burns died on February 22, 1990, in Santa Barbara, California.

Filmography

References

External links

Stephan W. Burns on Find A Grave

1954 births
1990 deaths
American male film actors
American male television actors
Male actors from Pennsylvania
Male actors from New Jersey
People from New Jersey
People from Santa Barbara, California
AIDS-related deaths in California
20th-century American male actors
Burials at Santa Barbara Cemetery